Birkfeld is a market town in the district of Weiz in the Austrian state of Styria.

Geography
It lies in the valley of the  river.

References

External links
  Official site

Cities and towns in Weiz District